Tiny-G was a Korean group based in South Korea, formed in 2012 by GNG Production and disbanded in 2015. The group's last known line-up was the duo of J.Min and Dohee, but originally consisted of J.Min, Dohee, Mint and Myungji.

History
The group appeared on MBC's show Show Champion on April 24, 2012  and performed the track “Polaris”, a song which singer Jay Park and actress Lee Si-young. The instrumentation was composed and produced by Cha Cha Malone and Jay Park. The song was titled "Polaris" and was released on May 5.  After "Music & Lyrics" was broadcast.

Their debut single "Tiny-G" was released on August 23, 2012. They made their debut on M! Countdown with "Tiny-G". The group released their second single, "Minimanimo" on January 20, 2013. On June 13, 2013, the group performed an OST for the game Dragon Nest titled "Here We Go", and on October 1, 2013, they released their third single, "Miss You".

On March 12, 2014, Dohee and J-Min performed an OST for the drama Cunning Single Lady titled "Mirror Mirror". On June 26, GnG Production announced that Myungji left the band. Tiny-G came back as a trio on July 3rd with the song "Ice Baby".  The sub-unit released their first single, "The Only One", featuring Thai artist Natthew. The music video was released November 25 and featured appearances by Natthew and Tiny-G member Dohee.  

On April 16, 2017, Dohee participated in an episode of "King of Masked Singer". On April 28, Mint's new drama THE iDOLM@STER.KR began airing, and she appeared in the attached girl group "Real Girls Project".

Former Members
J.Min - Leader, Main vocalist
Min Do-hee - Lead vocalist
Kim Myung-ji (김명지) - Main rapper, lead dancer, vocalist
Mint - Main dancer, lead rapper, vocalist

Discography

Singles

References

External links

 Official website
 Official FanCafe

Musical groups established in 2012
South Korean girl groups
K-pop music groups
2012 establishments in South Korea
Musical groups disestablished in 2015